Quoit may refer to:

 Quoit, a single-chambered megalithic tomb, also called a Dolmen
 Quoit (brooch), a pre-medieval type of brooch 
 A ring used in the game of quoits
 Chakram, a weapon sometimes called a war-quoit
 Quoit, Cornwall, a location in England
 Quoit Green, a location in Derbyshire, England

See also
 Coit (disambiguation)
 Koit (disambiguation)